Dumitru Stoica (born 30 September 1981) is a Romanian futsal player who plays for City'us and the Romanian national futsal team.

References

External links
UEFA profile

1981 births
Living people
Romanian men's futsal players